Jennifer "Jen" Longdon is an American politician and a Democratic member of the Arizona House of Representatives representing District 5 since January 9, 2023. She previously represented District 24 from 2019 to 2023. Longdon was elected in 2018 to succeed State Representative Lela Alston, who instead ran for State Senate.

Longdon was paralyzed in 2004 in a random drive-by shooting. She served on the Phoenix Mayor's Commission on Disability Issues, on the advisory board of Christopher and Dana Reeve Foundation Public Impact Panel, and as president of Arizonans for Gun Safety.

Michael Bloomberg 2020 Presidential Campaign 
In 2020, Longdon endorsed Michael Bloomberg's campaign for president, and volunteered in canvassing efforts in her home district. In January that year, Longdon's state legislature campaign manager Amber Rivera resigned and joined the Michael Bloomberg 2020 presidential campaign.

References

Year of birth missing (living people)
Living people
American politicians with disabilities
American shooting survivors
Democratic Party members of the Arizona House of Representatives
Politicians with paraplegia
Women state legislators in Arizona
21st-century American politicians
21st-century American women politicians